John Baker Hinkson (October 2, 1840 - May 22, 1901) was an American lawyer, businessman and politician from Pennsylvania who served as a Democratic mayor of Chester from 1893 to 1896.

Early life and education
Hinkson was born in Chester, Pennsylvania to Joseph H. and Lydia Ann (Edwards) Hinkson.

Hinkson graduated from Lafayette College in Easton, Pennsylvania with a Bachelor of Arts degree in 1860 and a Master of Arts in 1863. He was elected as a member of the Phi Beta Kappa academic honor society.

Hinkson studied law with the Honorable John M. Broomall and was admitted to the bar of Delaware County in August, 1863.

Career
Hinkson had a private law practice in Chester, Pennsylvania.

Hinkson served on the Chester City Council in 1876 and defeated Major Joseph R.T. Coates to serve as mayor of Chester from 1893 to 1896.  He ran for Pennsylvania State Senate but was defeated by Thomas Valentine Cooper.

Hinkson was a member of the Board of Trustees of the Pennsylvania Military College and served as Secretary and Treasurer until his death.

Hinkson was a director of the Delaware County Trust, Safe Deposit and Title Insurance Company and of the Esrey Manufacturing Company.

Personal life
In 1864, Hinkson married Kate W. Caldwell and together they had five children.

Hinkson and his wife were members of the Third Presbyterian Church of Chester where Hinkson served as an elder and trustee.

Hinkson is interred at the Chester Rural Cemetery in Chester, Pennsylvania.

See also
List of mayors of Chester, Pennsylvania

References

|-

1840 births
1901 deaths
19th-century American businesspeople
19th-century American lawyers
19th-century American politicians
Burials at Chester Rural Cemetery
Lafayette College alumni
Mayors of Chester, Pennsylvania
Pennsylvania city council members
Pennsylvania Democrats
Pennsylvania lawyers